Navi is a village in Võru Parish, Võru County in southeastern Estonia. It is located just northwest of the town Võru, north of the Tallinn–Tartu–Võru–Luhamaa road (E263). Navi has a population of 263.

Notable people
Enn Kasak (born 1954), philosopher of science; was born in Navi
Navitrolla (Heiki Trolla; born 1970), painter; spent his childhood in Navi
Ivari Padar (born 1965), politician; was born in Navi

References

Villages in Võru County